Robert Völkl (born 12 February 1993) is an Austrian professional footballer who plays as a midfielder for SV Grödig.

Career
Born in Bad Aibling, Völkl has played for FC Liefering, SV Grödig, Stuttgarter Kickers and Floridsdorfer AC.

References

1993 births
Living people
Austrian footballers
FC Liefering players
SV Grödig players
Stuttgarter Kickers players
Floridsdorfer AC players
Austrian Football Bundesliga players
Association football midfielders
Regionalliga players
2. Liga (Austria) players
Austrian expatriate footballers
Austrian expatriate sportspeople in Germany
Expatriate footballers in Germany